Piranch (also Romanized as Pīrānch; also known as Bīranj, Pīranj, and Pīrūnj) is a village in Damen Rural District, in the Central District of Iranshahr County, Sistan and Baluchestan Province, Iran. At the 2006 census, its population was 1,130, in 192 families.

References 

Populated places in Iranshahr County